Spinulum is a genus of club mosses in the family Lycopodiaceae. In the Pteridophyte Phylogeny Group classification of 2016 (PPG I), it is placed in the subfamily Lycopodioideae. Some sources do not recognize the genus, sinking it into Lycopodium. Spinulum annotinum is widespread in the temperate Northern Hemisphere.

Species
, the Checklist of Ferns and Lycophytes of the World recognized two species:
Spinulum annotinum (L.) A.Haines
Spinulum lioui Li Bing Zhang & H.He

References

Lycopodiaceae
Lycophyte genera